is a Japanese erotic video game developed by Pajamas Soft and was first released on October 6, 2000, and a DVD edition for Windows was released on January 25, 2008. The game was ported to the Dreamcast on November 29, 2001, with the adult content removed by KID. A fan disc entitled Prism Box went on sale on April 27, 2001.

The sequel, Prism Ark, came out on August 25, 2006. Some characters also made an appearance on the Prism Ark anime.

Characters

Meister is the main protagonist.
Princea gave a pocket watch to him in their childhood. He comes from his hometown for the purpose of being a knight. At first, his swordplay grade is bad, but he improves his skill in his training.

Meister is Princea's childhood friend, but she forgot him until a certain event. She has a younger brother, but he died in a little while after she and Meister parted in their childhood.

Komet is a maidservant at a dining hall Fushatei. She seems to have a bad sense of balance, and she always breaks plate in opening. She becomes a maidservant of Meister and Princea.

Kamina is a shrine maiden come from Wa-no-kuni. She entered into the country for the purpose of a secret command.

Maple, nicknamed Mel, is Meister's sister-in-law. She is loved by a rural knight. She is seriously ill.

Ina came from Yū-no-kuni. She seems to like a bomb.

Ange works a church. She is famous for a certain channel.

Echo, who is the master of Fushatei, always smile however she is angry. She is a relation of Princea.

Ahnya is a female of half beast tribes.

Lise, is a blunderer and a crybaby, trains herself with the aim of becoming a knight. She appears in DC version.

Freyja is a minstrel come to capital Freeden. She appears in DC version.

See also
Prism Ark

External links
Pajamas Soft's official game website 
KID's official game website 

2000 video games
Bishōjo games
Dreamcast games
Eroge
Japan-exclusive video games
Video games developed in Japan
Windows games